ALLPlayer is a cross-platform media player and streaming media server written by ALLPlayer Group Ltd. ALLPlayer is available for desktop Windows and mobile platforms, such as Android, iPad and iPhone iOS . Program is available on  App store, Google Play Store and Microsoft Windows Store. 
ALLPlayer supports many file formats, including video CD and streaming protocols. It is able to stream media over computer networks. ALLPlayer features include automatic codecs updates, cooperation with subtitles servers (e.g. opensubtitles.org) for downloading subtitles in multiple languages, and the ability to play BitTorrent movies and series with matching subtitles. ALLPlayer has remote control and keyboard hotkeys.
It can play dozens if not all known audio and video formats. Most known of them are: 3G2, AVI, Matroska (MKV), FLV, DAT, MOV, M2TS, MP4, 3GP, VOB, MPG, APE, AU, MKA, MP3, OGG, WAV and AC3, as well as audio CDs, and a specified urls. 
ALLPlayer can play incomplete, or unfinished files, such as files that are still downloading via a peer-to-peer (P2P) network.

Features 
 playing movies from .torrent files
 playing rar files
 dozens of online radio stations
 support for up to 4 monitors or TVs
 automatic playback for next parts of movies or series
 support for Dolby Surround, DTS, 3D audio, SPDIF and other
 playlist
 EQ
 support for audio and video streams, including video from YouTube
 image rotation, color correction, improving the quality
 turning off computer or monitor after the movie
 autoresume
 intelligent subtitles
 dubbing
 parental control - password on a file

External links 

 
 Softpedia

Media players
MacOS media players
Software that uses FFmpeg
Streaming media systems
Streaming software
Webcams
Windows media players
Universal Windows Platform apps